Richard Frederick Johnston (April 6, 1863 – April 4, 1934) was a 19th-century center fielder in Major League Baseball. He played eight seasons in the majors, for five different teams in three different leagues.

In 746 games over eight seasons, Johnston posted a .251 batting average (751-for-2992) with 453 runs, 33 home runs, 386 RBIs and 151 stolen bases.

See also
 List of Major League Baseball annual triples leaders

Sources

References

1863 births
1934 deaths
Major League Baseball center fielders
Baseball players from New York (state)
Richmond Virginians players
Boston Beaneaters players
Boston Reds (PL) players
New York Giants (PL) players
Cincinnati Kelly's Killers players
19th-century baseball players
Sportspeople from Kingston, New York
Richmond Virginias players
Richmond Virginians (minor league) players
New Haven Nutmegs players
Elmira Gladiators players
Kingston Patriarchs players
Kingston Colonels players
Burials in Ulster County, New York